Naughty Neighbors can refer to:

Naughty Neighbors a 1939 Looney Tunes cartoon featuring Porky Pig
Naughty Neighbors, a 1989 pornographic film produced by Harold Lime